The 2010 Destination X was a professional wrestling pay-per-view (PPV) event produced by the Total Nonstop Action Wrestling (TNA) promotion, which took place on March 21, 2010 at the TNA Impact! Zone in Orlando, Florida. The event was originally advertised as an all X Division pay-per-view. It was the sixth event under the Destination X chronology and the third event of the 2010 TNA PPV schedule.

In October 2017, with the launch of the Global Wrestling Network, the event became available to stream on demand.

Storylines

Destination X feature nine professional wrestling matches that involved different wrestlers from pre-existing scripted feuds and storylines. Wrestlers were portrayed as villains, heroes or less distinguishable characters in the scripted events that built tension and culminated into a wrestling match or series of matches.

Results

References

External links
TNADestinationxppv.com
TNA Wrestling.com

Destination X
2010 in professional wrestling in Florida
Professional wrestling shows in Orlando, Florida
March 2010 events in the United States
2010 Total Nonstop Action Wrestling pay-per-view events